The  Moldova–Ukraine border, the official border between Republic of Moldova and Ukraine, was established after the dissolution of the Soviet Union. About  of it constitutes the de facto border between Ukraine and the unrecognized breakaway republic of Transnistria.

The border runs from the northern Romania-Moldova-Ukraine tripoint in the northwest of the country, from the Ukrainian village and border crossing of Mamalyha, Ukraine to Criva, Briceni, Moldova. It runs east until the city and border crossing of Mohyliv-Podilskyi, where it turns southeast and enters the channel of the river of Dniester. By the village of Nimereuca the territory of Transnistria begins, which ends by Purcari. Several kilometers further it turns west. By Basarabeasca District it turns south and runs until the southern Romania-Moldova-Ukraine tripoint near Galați, Romania and Reni, Ukraine, by Danube.

 the border had 67 permanent official border crossings classified into three categories: international, for crossing by citizens of any state; interstate, for crossing only by citizens of Moldova and Ukraine; and local, for local border traffic. Of them, 25 crossings are along the territory held by the Transnistrian separatist regime and are not monitored by the Moldovan border guards. There is a unique disputed situation with the Moldovan village of Palanca, Ștefan Vodă.  its territory abuts to Odesa Oblast of Ukraine in such a way that there is no way to travel to the southwestern part of Odesa Oblast from the rest of Ukraine by land without crossing Moldova.

List of border crossings with Moldova 
Border Crossing Checkpoints (BCPs) are listed by the State Border Guard Service of Ukraine.  The Moldova-Ukraine BCPs are listed here.

Stateless persons crossing into Ukraine 
Per the Ukraine Government's site as of 21 Sep 2017 "Foreigners and stateless persons enter Ukraine only when they have a passport and a certain type of visa, which is required by a current legislation or an international agreement, if there are no other requirements. Copies of passports, visas and other documents confirmed by a notary give no right to cross the state border."

See also
 Transnistrian border customs issues
 Moldova–Ukraine relations
European Union Border Assistance Mission to Moldova and Ukraine

References

 
Borders of Moldova
Borders of Ukraine
1991 establishments in Moldova
1991 establishments in Ukraine
International borders
Internal borders of the Soviet Union
Geography of Transnistria
Transnistria conflict
Border
Transnistria–Ukraine relations